Filmography for the Indian actor Nazir Hussain, who has acted in more than 500 films. The list below is incomplete.

Filmography

References

External links
 

Indian filmographies
Male actor filmographies